The Alaska Railroad  is a Class II railroad that operates freight and passenger trains in the state of Alaska.

The Alaska Central went bankrupt in 1907 and was reorganized as the Alaska Northern Railroad Company in 1911, which extended the line another  northward. On March 12, 1914, the U.S. Congress agreed to fund construction and operation of an all-weather railroad from Seward to Fairbanks and purchased the rail line from the financially struggling Alaska Northern.

As the government started building the estimated $35 million railroad, it opened a construction town along Ship Creek, eventually giving rise to Anchorage, now the state's largest city. In 1917, the government purchased the narrow gauge Tanana Valley Railroad, mostly for its railyard in Fairbanks. The railroad was completed on July 15, 1923 with President Warren G. Harding travelling to Alaska to drive a ceremonial golden spike at Nenana. Ownership of the railroad passed from the federal government, to the state of Alaska on January 6, 1985.

History

In 1903 a company called the Alaska Central Railroad began to build a rail line beginning at Seward, near the southern tip of the Kenai Peninsula in Alaska, northward. The company built  of track by 1909 and went into receivership. This route carried passengers, freight and mail to the upper Turnagain Arm. From there, goods were taken by boat at high tide, and by dog team or pack train to Eklutna and the Matanuska-Susitna Valley.

In 1909, another company, the Alaska Northern Railroad Company, bought the rail line and extended it another  northward. From the new end, goods were floated down the Turnagain Arm in small boats. The Alaska Northern Railroad went into receivership in 1914.

About this time, the United States government was planning a railroad route from Seward to the interior town of Fairbanks. The President, William Howard Taft, authorized a commission to survey a route in 1912.

In 1914, the government bought the Alaska Northern Railroad and moved its headquarters to Ship Creek, in what would later become Anchorage. The government began to extend the rail line northward.

In 1917, the Tanana Valley Railroad in Fairbanks was heading into bankruptcy. It owned a small   (narrow gauge) line that serviced the towns of Fairbanks and the mining communities in the area as well as the boat docks on the Tanana River near Fairbanks.

The government bought the Tanana Valley Railroad, principally for its terminal facilities. The section between Fairbanks and Happy was converted to dual gauge to complete the  line from Seward to Fairbanks. The government extended the southern portion of the track to Nenana, and later converted the extension to standard gauge. The Alaska Railroad continued to operate the remaining TVRR narrow gauge line as the Chatanika Branch (the terminus was located near the Yukon River), until decommissioning it in 1930.

In 1923 they built the  Mears Memorial Bridge across the Tanana River at Nenana. This was the final link in the Alaska Railroad and at the time, was the second longest single-span steel railroad bridge in the country. U.S. President Warren G. Harding drove the golden spike that completed the railroad on July 15, 1923, on the north side of the bridge. The railroad was part of the US Department of the Interior.

The Alaska Railroad's first diesel locomotive entered service in 1944. The railroad retired its last steam locomotive in 1966.

The railroad was greatly affected by the Good Friday earthquake which struck southern Alaska in 1964. The yard and trackage around Seward buckled and the trackage along Turnagain Arm was damaged by floodwaters and landslides. It took several months to restore full service along the line.

In 1967, the railroad was transferred to the Federal Railroad Administration, an agency within the newly created United States Department of Transportation.

On January 6, 1985, the state of Alaska bought the railroad from the U.S. government for $22.3 million, based on a valuation determined by the US Railway Association. The state immediately invested over $70 million on improvements and repairs that compensated for years of deferred maintenance. The purchase agreement prohibits the Alaska Railroad from paying dividends or otherwise returning capital to the state of Alaska, unlike the state's other quasi-corporations: the Alaska Permanent Fund, the Alaska Housing Finance Corporation, and the Alaska Industrial Development and Export Authority.

Proposed expansion in Alaska

Northern Rail Extension to Delta Junction 
As of April 2010, an extension of the railroad from Fairbanks to Delta Junction is planned, having been proposed as early as 2009. Originally, the extension was to be completed by 2010, but construction of a major bridge across the Tanana River has barely begun, and construction of track has not started. A proposed 2011 Alaska state budget would provide $40 million in funding for the bridge, which would initially be for vehicular use, but would support Alaska Railroad trains once construction of track to Delta Junction began. The United States Department of Defense would provide another $100 million in funds, as the bridge and subsequent rail line would provide year-round access to Fort Greely and the Joint Tanana Training Complex. A groundbreaking ceremony for the Tanana River Bridge took place on September 28, 2011. The new bridge was opened (for military road traffic only) in 2014.

Point MacKenzie Line 
On 21 November 2011, the Surface Transportation Board approved the construction of a new  line between Port MacKenzie and the existing mainline at Houston, Alaska.

Anchorage Commuter Rail Service 
There are plans to provide commuter rail service within the Anchorage metropolitan area (Anchorage to Mat-Su Valley via Eagle River, north Anchorage to south Anchorage) but that requires additional tracks be laid due to a heavy freight schedule.

A spur line was built to Ted Stevens International Airport in 2003, along with a depot at the airport, but the line never received scheduled service. It is not open to the public, but cruise lines can charter trains to the airport to bring passengers to cruise ships. The Alaska Railroad currently leases the airport depot, officially named after Bill Sheffield, to citizens for private events including conferences, seminars, and corporate functions.

Proposed connection to the contiguous 48 states

In 2001 federal legislation, sponsored by U.S. Senator Frank Murkowski (R-Alaska, and later state governor of Alaska), formed a bilateral commission to study feasibility of building a rail link between Canada and Alaska; Canada was asked to be part of the commission, but the Canadian federal government did not choose to join the commission and commit funds for the study. The Yukon territorial government showed some interest.

A June 2006 report by the commission recommended Carmacks, Yukon, as a hub. A line would go northward to Delta Junction, Alaska (Alaska Railroad's northern end-of-track). Another line would go from Carmacks to Hazelton, British Columbia (which is served by the CN), and that line would go through Watson Lake, Yukon, and Dease Lake, British Columbia, along the way.

Following the demise of the ill-fated Keystone Pipeline, the Alaska Canada Rail Link (ACRL) was rekindled as an alternative. In November 2015, the National Post reported that a link between the southern provinces and the Alaska Railroad was again being considered by the Canadian federal government, this time routing to Alberta. In this scenario, the route would originate at Delta Junction, Alaska and use Carmacks, Yukon as a hub, like prior plans. The route would continue through Watson Lake, Yukon before entering British Columbia, where it would stop at Fort Nelson, British Columbia. It would continue to Peace River, Alberta, with its southern terminus at Fort McMurray. The route is endorsed by the Assembly of First Nations. It is unclear whether this rail connection would ever be expanded to also serve passengers, like the Alaska Railroad.

On September 25, 2020, then President Donald Trump announced he would issue a presidential permit to the Alaska-Alberta Railway Development Corporation (A2A Railway) which has an agreement with Alaska Railway to develop a joint operating plan for the rail connection to Canada. The proposed A2A Railway would have connected to the Alaska Railroad at North Pole, Alaska, and run through the Yukon to Fort Nelson, BC, and from there to a terminus at Fort McMurray, Alberta. The A2A Railway had also been negotiating with the Mat-Su Borough on an agreement to complete the Port Mackenzie Railway Extension.

Executives

General managers under federal ownership

 Col. Frederick Mears, 1919-1923 (was originally head of the railroad as chairman of the Alaska Engineering Commission)
 Col. James Gordon Steese, 1923-1923
 Lee H. Landis, 1923–1924
 Noel W. Smith, 1924–1928
 Col. Otto F. Ohlson, 1928–1945
 Col. John P. Johnson, 1946–1953
 Frank E. Kalbaugh, 1953–1955
 Reginald N. Whitman, 1955–1956
 John H. Lloyd, 1956–1958
 Robert H. Anderson, 1958–1960
 Donald J. Smith, 1960–1962
 John E. Manley, 1962–1971
 Walker S. Johnston, 1971-1975
 William L. Dorcy, 1975–1979
 Steven R. Ditmeyer (Acting) 1979-1980
 Frank H. Jones, 1980–1985

Presidents under state ownership

 Frank Turpin, 1985-1991
 Robert Hatfield Jr., 1991–1997
 Bill Sheffield, 1997–2001
 Patrick K. Gamble, 2001–2010
 Christopher Aadnesen, 2010–2013
 Bill O'Leary, 2013–present

Routes and tourism

The railroad is a major tourist attraction in the summer. Coach cars feature wide windows and domes. Private cars owned by the major cruise companies are towed behind the Alaska Railroad's own cars, and trips are included with various cruise packages.

Routes
 The Denali Star runs from Anchorage to Fairbanks (approximately 12 hours one-way) and back with stops in Talkeetna and Denali National Park, from which various flight and bus tours are available. The Denali Star only operates between May 15 and September 15.
 The Aurora Winter Train is available in winter months (September 15 - May 15) on a reduced weekend-only schedule (Northbound, Saturday mornings; Southbound, Sunday mornings) between Anchorage and Fairbanks on the same route as the Denali Star.
 The Coastal Classic winds its way south from Anchorage along Turnagain Arm before turning south to the Kenai Peninsula, eventually reaching Seward. This  trip takes around four and a half hours due to some slow trackage as the line winds its way over mountains.
 The Glacier Discovery provides a short (2 hour) trip south from Anchorage to Whittier for a brief stop before reversing direction for a stop at Grandview before returning to Anchorage in the evening.
 The Hurricane Turn provides rail service to people living between Talkeetna and the Hurricane area. This area has no roads, and the railroad provides the lifeline for residents who depend on the service to obtain food and supplies. One of the last flag-stop railway routes in the United States, passengers can board the Hurricane Turn anywhere along the route by waving a large white flag or cloth.
 A spur providing service to the Ted Stevens Anchorage International Airport is used during the summer season for cruise ship service only. It was activated temporarily during the Alaska Federation of Natives (AFN) 2006 convention to provide airport-to-hotel mass transit for delegates.

Rolling stock

By 1936, the company had rostered 27 steam locomotives, 16 railcars, 40 passenger cars and 858 freight cars.

Active
, Alaska Railroad rosters a total of 51 locomotives, two control cab units, and one DMU (self-propelled railcar):
 28 EMD SD70MAC locomotives (12 equipped with head-end power for passenger service)
 15 EMD GP40-2 locomotives
 8 EMD GP38-2 locomotives
 2 EMD F40PH control cab units
 1 Colorado Railcar DMU

Retired
 Budd Rail Diesel Car (RDC) (Retired 2009; sold to TriMet, in Oregon, as spare equipment for its WES Commuter Rail service)
 EMD MP15AC (Retired 2009)
 EMD F7
EMD FP7 (Two units, 1510 and 1512 sold to Verde Canyon Railroad in Arizona for excursions)

Other

In 2011 the Alaska Railroad reacquired ARR 557, the last steam locomotive bought new by the railroad and the last steam locomotive used by the railroad, with the intent to refurbish and operate it in special excursions between Anchorage and Portage.

A USATC S160 "2-8-0 Consolidation" engine built in 1944 by Baldwin Locomotive Works, 557 was originally coal-fired, but was converted to oil in 1955. It operated until 1964, when it was deemed surplus and sold as scrap. It was purchased by Monte Holm of Moses Lake, Washington and displayed in his House of Poverty Museum.

After Holm's death in 2006, Jim and Vic Jansen bought 557 from the museum and returned it to the Alaska Railroad on the condition that it be restored to operation and put into service.

The locomotive was sold to the non-profit Engine 557 Restoration Company for "One Dollar ($1.00) and other good and valuable considerations" and they have invested 77 months and over 75,000 hours of volunteer time in the restoration and overhaul.

In popular culture
 The Alaska Railroad was prominently featured in the movie Runaway Train.
 The Simpson family rides the Alaska Railroad in The Simpsons Movie.
 The railroad is mentioned in the 1995 film Balto.
 The Railroad is the subject of a 2013 reality TV series named Railroad Alaska on Destination America.

See also

 Alaskan Engineering Commission, the Federal agency which constructed the Alaska railways
 Anton Anderson Memorial Tunnel
 Transportation in North America
 White Pass and Yukon Route

References

General references

Alaska Railroad

Surface Transportation Board, ALASKA RAILROAD CORPORATION--CONSTRUCTION AND OPERATION EXEMPTION--RAIL LINE BETWEEN EIELSON AIR FORCE BASE (NORTH POLE) AND FORT GREELY (DELTA JUNCTION), AK, October 4, 2007

Historical references

 
 
 
 
 
 
 
 
 
 
 
 
 
 
 
 
 
 Also see:
  Rights of way in Alaska; railroad rights of way; reservations; water transportation connections; State title to submerged lands; Federal repossession as trustee; "navigable waters" defined; posting schedules of rates; changes in rates
 Rights of way for Alaskan wagon roads, wire rope, aerial, or other tramways; reservations; filing preliminary survey and map of locations; alteration, amendment, repeal, or grant of equal rights; forfeiture of rights; reversion of grant; liens

External links 

Alaska Railroad – A current route map for the ARR
Reconnaissance Survey for the Alaska Railroad – University of Washington Digital Collection
Historic American Engineering Record (HAER) documentation:

 
1914 establishments in Alaska
Alaska Railroad
Historic American Engineering Record in Alaska
Kenai Mountains-Turnagain Arm National Heritage Area
Passenger railroads in Alaska
Transportation in Anchorage, Alaska
Transportation in Denali Borough, Alaska
Transportation in Fairbanks North Star Borough, Alaska
Transportation in Kenai Peninsula Borough, Alaska
Transportation in Matanuska-Susitna Borough, Alaska
Transportation in Unorganized Borough, Alaska
Yukon–Koyukuk Census Area, Alaska
Historic Civil Engineering Landmarks
Regional railroads in the United States